Adam Setla (born 26 October 1992) is a Polish footballer who plays as a striker for LZS Starowice.

Career

Setla started his career with Polish seventh division side Góral Sidzina. Before the second half of 2010–11, Setla signed for Polish fourth division club Odra Opole, helping them earn promotion to the Polish third division. In 2015, he signed for Ruch Chorzów in the Polish top flight, where he made 1 league appearance and scored 0 goals. On 13 September 2015, Setla debuted for Ruch Chorzów during a 1–0 win over Górnik Zabrze. In 2016, he signed for Polish second division team MKS Kluczbork.

In 2017, Setla returned to Polish second division outfit Ruch Chorzów. Before the second half of 2017–18, he signed for Gwardia Koszalin in the Polish third division. Before the second half of 2018–19, he signed for Polish fifth division side , helping them earn promotion to the Polish fourth division.

References

External links
 

Polish footballers
Expatriate footballers in Germany
Association football forwards
Living people
1992 births
Ekstraklasa players
I liga players
II liga players
III liga players
Odra Opole players
Polish expatriate sportspeople in Germany
MKS Kluczbork players
Ruch Chorzów players
Polish expatriate footballers
Gwardia Koszalin players
GKS Bełchatów players
People from Niemodlin